Leping Subdistrict is a subdistrict in Louxing District of Loudi City, Hunan Province, People's Republic of China.

Administrative division
The subdistrict is divided into 12 communities, the following areas: 
 Jiexin Community
 Xiantong Community
 Tongjia Community
 Mifeng Community
 Qingquan Community
 Changchun Community
 Liaojia Community
 Xinjian Community
 Yuetang Community
 Datang Community
 Jingu Community
 Huochezhan Community

Geography
Lianshui River flows through the subdistrict.

Economy
The economy is supported primarily by commerce and local industry.

Transportation
Loudi railway station serves the subdistrict.

Notable people
 Li Buyun, Honorary dean of the College of Law, Hunan University.
 Wu Linsheng, revolutionary.
 Wei Huazheng, calligrapher.

References

External links

Divisions of Louxing District